Falta Assembly constituency is a Legislative Assembly constituency of South 24 Parganas district in the Indian State of West Bengal.

Overview
As per order of the Delimitation Commission in respect of the Delimitation of constituencies in the West Bengal, Falta Assembly constituency is composed of the following:
 Falta community development block
 Bhadura Haridas and Kalatalahat gram panchayats of Diamond Harbour II community development block

Falta Assembly constituency is a part of No. 21 Diamond Harbour (Lok Sabha constituency).

Members of Legislative Assembly

Election Results

Legislative Assembly Election 2011

Legislative Assembly Elections 1977-2006
In 2006, Chandana Ghosh Dastidar of CPI(M) won the Falta Assembly constituency defeating her nearest rival Tamonash Ghosh of AITC. Tamonash Ghosh of AITC defeated Malina Mistry of CPI(M) in 2001. Sudhir Bhattacharya of INC defeated Arati Dasgupta of CPI(M) in 1996. Arati Dasgupta of CPI(M) defeated Sudhir Bhattacharya of INC in 1991 and Dinabandhu Halder of INC in 1987. Nimai Chandra Das of CPI(M) defeated Asraf Ali of INC in 1982 and Mohini Mohan Parui of INC in 1977.

Legislative Assembly Elections 1952-1972
Mohini Mohan Parui of INC won in 1972. Jyotish Chandra Roy of CPI(M) won in 1971, 1969 and 1967. Khagendra Nath Das of INC won in 1962 and 1957. Jyotish Chandra Roy of CPI won in 1952.

References

Notes

Citations

Assembly constituencies of West Bengal
Politics of South 24 Parganas district